The Young Turks were a group of leading scientists who worked at Bell Labs, who were insatiably curious about the science behind communications. Many of them were encouraged to take risks, free from the responsibilities of applying for grants or from teaching. "We were first-class troublemakers," Richard Hamming later recalled. "We did unconventional things in unconventional ways and still got valuable results. Thus management had to tolerate us and let us alone a lot of the time."

Members
 Philip Warren Anderson
 William O. Baker
 James Fisk
 Mervin Kelly
 John R. Pierce
 Richard Hamming
 Claude Shannon
 William Shockley
 Charles Townes
 John Tukey

References

Bell Labs